Callionymus cooperi, Cooper's dragonet, is a species of dragonet found only around the Maldives where it occurs at depths of from . The specific name honours the U.S. physician, ichthyologist, ornithologist and malacologist James Graham Cooper (1830-1902).

References 

C
Fish described in 1908